Tychius is a genus of leguminous seed weevils in the family Curculionidae. There are at least 630 described species in Tychius.

See also
 List of Tychius species

References

Further reading

External links
 

Curculioninae